Ouzo Plomari (Greek: Ούζο Πλωμάρι) is the name of a historic Greek ouzo company on the island of Lesbos, Greece.

It was founded in 1894 by Isidoros Arvanitis, a native of Plomari. The company exports to more than 40 countries.

Gallery

References

External links
Official site

Drink companies of Greece
Greek brands
Food and drink companies established in 1894
Companies based in Lesbos
1894 establishments in Greece
Greek companies established in 1894